2004 in the Philippines details events of note that happened in the Philippines in the year 2004.

Incumbents

 President: Gloria Macapagal Arroyo (Lakas-CMD)
 Vice President
Teofisto Guingona (NPC) (until June 30)
Noli de Castro (Independent) (starting June 30)
 Senate President: Franklin Drilon
 House Speaker: Jose de Venecia
 Chief Justice: Hilario Davide
 Philippine Congress
12th Congress of the Philippines (until June 4)
13th Congress of the Philippines (starting July 26)

Events

February
 February 27 – SuperFerry 14 is bombed by the Abu Sayyaf Group terrorists, killing 116 people. It is considered as the worst terrorist attack in the Philippines.

May
 May 10:
 Synchronized national and local elections are held. This was the first election participated by Overseas Filipinos under the Overseas Absentee Voting Act of 2003 
 Gloria Macapagal Arroyo is re-elected in presidential elections.

June
 June 30 – Gloria Macapagal Arroyo is inaugurated in Cebu City, along with Noli de Castro as president and vice president, respectively.

July
 July 7–20 – Angelo dela Cruz, an Overseas Filipino who was working as a truck driver was abducted by the Iraqi insurgents near the Iraqi city of Fallujah. He was released after the Philippine Government moved up its withdrawal of troops in Iraq as an answer to the demand of his captors. Dela Cruz was released on July 20 and returned home the day after.
 July 10 – Santa Rosa becomes a city in the province of Laguna through ratification of Republic Act 9264 which was approved on March 10.
 July 23 – SAI building, a 5-year-old eight-story building on Padre Rada Street, collapses in the heart of busy Divisoria in Manila at 4:40 pm, crashing down on Italy Marketing building across the street.

November
 November 14–December 4 – Typhoons Unding, Violeta, Winnie and Yoyong hits the Philippines, and left at least 1,060 people dead, more than 560 missing and 850,000 displaced.
 November 16 – Hacienda Luisita massacre occur, twelve picketing farmers and two children were killed and hundreds were injured when police and soldiers dispatched by then Labour Secretary Patricia Santo Tomás, stormed a blockade by plantation workers.

December
 December 8 – Taguig becomes a highly urbanized city in Metro Manila through Republic Act No. 8487 which was enacted since December 8, 1998. After a recount of votes granted by the Supreme Court favoring the move.
 December 26 – Eight Filipinos are among the victims of the 2004 Indian Ocean tsunami.

Holidays

On November 13, 2002, Republic Act No. 9177 declares Eidul Fitr as a regular holiday. The EDSA Revolution Anniversary was proclaimed since 2002 as a special non-working holiday.  Note that in the list, holidays in bold are "regular holidays" and those in italics are "nationwide special days".

 January 1 – New Year's Day
 February 25 – EDSA Revolution Anniversary
 April 8 – Maundy Thursday
 April 9:
 Good Friday
 Araw ng Kagitingan (Day of Valor)
 May 1 – Labor Day
 June 12 – Independence Day 
 August 21 – Ninoy Aquino Day
 August 29 – National Heroes Day
 November 1 –  All Saints Day
 November 13 – Eidul Fitr
 November 30 – Bonifacio Day
 December 25 – Christmas Day
 December 30 – Rizal Day
 December 31 – Last Day of the Year

In addition, several other places observe local holidays, such as the foundation of their town. These are also "special days."

Television

Premieres
 March 1 – Wazzup Wazzup (Studio 23, now ABS-CBN Sports and Action)
 March 15 – 24 Oras (GMA Network)
 April 17 – Art Angel (GMA Network)
 May 23 – Rated K (now Rated Korina) (ABS-CBN)

Finales
 March 12 – Frontpage: Ulat ni Mel Tiangco (GMA Network)
 April 7 – Balitang Balita (ABC 5, now TV5)

Sports
 May 9 -- Manny Pacquiao and Juan Manuel Marquez Ended in a Split Draw 
 July 7 -- The Barangay Ginebra Kings Ended Their 7-Year Drought with the 3-1 Finals Series Victory over Red Bull Barako in the Fiesta Conference Finals
 August 13–29 – The Philippines competed at the 2004 Summer Olympics in Athens.
 September 30 -- De La Salle Green Archers Defeats FEU Tamaraws in the Best-of-3 Finals in the UAAP Season 67 Men's Basketball

Births
 January 27:
 Francine Diaz, actress
 Xyriel Manabat, actress
 February 18 – Kyron Aguilera, actor
 March 3 – Izzy Canillo, actor
 March 8 – Brenna Garcia, actress
 March 18 – Avery Balasbas, actress
 March 26 – Awra Briguela, actor
 April 6 – Tan Roncal, actor
 April 16 – Elha Nympha, singer
 June 12 – Nic Cartagena, actor and singer
 July 14 – Barbara Miguel, actress
 August 8 – Miggs Cuaderno, actor
 August 19 – Mona Louise Rey, actress and commercial model
 September 13 – Criza Taa, actress
 October 6 – Cha-Cha Cañete, actress
 October 9 – Althea Ablan, actress
 November 13 – Elijah Alejo, actress
 November 21 – Lyca Gairanod, singer and actress
 December 15 – Clarence Delgado, actor

Deaths
 January 2 – Maria Clara Lobregat, Latina Zamboangueña, Filipina politician from Zamboanga City (b. 1921)
 January 19 – Herminio A. Astorga, vice-mayor of the City of Manila. (b. 1929)
 January 27 – Salvador Laurel, former Philippine Vice President of the Aquino Administration (b. 1928)
 February 18 – Frankie Evangelista, former radio-TV anchor (b. 1934)
 February 21 – Nestor de Villa, former actor (b. 1928)
 March 4 – Halina Perez, former sexy star (b. 1981)
 April 8 – Hamsiraji Marusi Sali, Filipino terrorist
 April 27 – Larry Silva, former actor and comedian (b. 1937)
 April 29 – Nick Joaquin, writer/historian/journalist (born 1917)
 May 5:
 José Maceda, composer and ethnomusicologist. (b. 1917)
 Teddy Alfarero, former basketball player (b. 1963)
 May 13 – Vicatan, comic book artist and novelist (b. 1948)
 May 17 – Enrique Zobel, Filipino businessman and polo player. (b. 1927)
 June 10 – Voltaire Y. Rosales, Filipino Executive Judge (b. 1956)
 July 3 – Mamintal M. Adiong Sr., Filipino politician, serving as Governor of Lanao del Sur (b. 1936)
 July 31 – Roger Mariano, former DZJC anchor (b. 1960)
 August 2 – Arturo Tolentino, former Philippine Vice President (b. 1910)
 August 14 – Bomber Moran, former actor (b. 1944)
 August 17 – Luz Magsaysay, wife of Philippine President Ramon Magsaysay and the seventh First Lady of the Philippines. (b. 1915)
 August 27 – Nestor Ponce, Jr., former Undersecretary of the Presidential Adviser of Arroyo Administration (b. 1951)
 August 30 – Dely Atay-Atayan, former comedian (b. 1914)
 September 26 – Beda Orquejo, former TV Director/Editor/Cameraman of Family Rosary Crusade (b. 1948)
 September 24 – Christopher Misajon, former GMA Iloilo correspondent (b. 1973)
 October 3 – Engracio Arazas, former basketball player (b. 1938)
 October 4 – Rio Diaz, former TV host/actress/beauty queen (b. 1959)
 October 13 – Enrique Fernando, 13th Chief Justice of the Supreme Court of the Philippines (b. 1915)
 October 28 – Edgardo Fulgencio, Olympic Basketball Player (b. 1917)
 November 10 – Katy de la Cruz, singer, actress, known as "Queen of Bodabil" (b. 1907)
 November 11 – Saturnino Ador-Dionisio, Filipino nutritionist (b. 1910)
 November 19 – George Canseco, Filipino song composer (b. 1934)
 November 28 – Zenaida Amador, oldest theater group from Repertory Philippines (b. 1933)
 December 7 – Pacita Abad, painter (b. 1946)
 December 14 – Fernando Poe, Jr., actor and politician (b. 1939)

References

 
2004 in Southeast Asia
Philippines
2000s in the Philippines
Years of the 21st century in the Philippines